A leadership election was held by the United Malays National Organisation (UMNO) party on 10 October 1996. It was won by incumbent Prime Minister and President of UMNO, Mahathir Mohamad.

Supreme Council election results
Source

Permanent Chairman

Deputy Permanent Chairman

President

Deputy President

Vice Presidents

Supreme Council Members

See also
1999 Malaysian general election
Fifth Mahathir cabinet

References

1996 elections in Malaysia
United Malays National Organisation leadership election
United Malays National Organisation leadership elections